Jörg Bruder (16 November 1937 – 11 July 1973) was a Brazilian sailor and geology professor at the University of São Paulo. Born in São Paulo, he became the first three-time Finn Gold Cup champion. Bruder died in 1973 in Orly, Paris, on Varig Flight 820 to Paris, when travelling to the Finn Gold Cup.

During the 2003 Finn Gold Cup in Rio de Janeiro, the Brazilian Olympic Committee presented the International Finn Association with a trophy honoring Bruder. The IFA has since used the Jörg Bruder Silver Cup to award Junior World Champions of the class.

Biography
Known for a successful sailing career, he participated in the 1964, 1968 and 1972 Olympics and was a two-time winner at the Pan American Games. Bruder developed wooden masts with lighter weight and special curves, later developing aluminium masts, which were used by many Finn sailors around the world.

Bruder placed seventh in the 1964  Olympics Finn competition, which was followed by a ninth place in 1968 Olympics. He then changed to the Star class teaming with Jan Aten to sail "Buho Blanco" (BL 5217), a wooden boat purchased in Mexico. They won the 7th District & Brazilian Star Championship qualifiers in Rio de Janeiro for the Olympics. In July, they were 1972 Kiel Week champions, sailing against a 60 other boats.

At the Olympic competition in Kiel, the weak winds dominated the early days. Then the Munich massacre interrupted the sequence of races. Entering the final regatta with medal chances, Bruder and Aten finished in fourth place overall.

He also was 1972 Brazilian National champion in the Snipe class.

References

1937 births
1973 deaths
Olympic sailors of Brazil
Brazilian male sailors (sport)
Brazilian people of German descent
Pan American Games medalists in sailing
Sailors at the 1964 Summer Olympics – Finn
Sailors at the 1968 Summer Olympics – Finn
Sailors at the 1972 Summer Olympics – Star
Snipe class sailors
Finn class world champions
World champions in sailing for Brazil
Pan American Games gold medalists for Brazil
Sailors at the 1967 Pan American Games
Sailors at the 1971 Pan American Games
Victims of aviation accidents or incidents in France
Victims of aviation accidents or incidents in 1973
Medalists at the 1967 Pan American Games
Medalists at the 1971 Pan American Games
Sportspeople from São Paulo